Amy Grant is the eponymous debut studio album by then-teenage Christian singer Amy Grant, released in 1977 on Myrrh Records. Three songs from the album made Top Ten Christian radio airplay: "Old Man's Rubble", "Beautiful Music", and "What a Difference You've Made". The latter track was made more famous by country singer Ronnie Milsap, as "What a Difference You've Made in My Life".

Track listing

Music personnel 

 Amy Grant – lead vocals
 Randy Goodrum – keyboards
 Shane Keister – keyboards
 Brown Bannister – acoustic guitar, bells
 Steve Chapman – acoustic guitar
 Ron Elder – acoustic guitar
 Pete Bordonali – electric guitar
 Joe Wilson – electric guitar
 Reggie Young – electric guitar
 Steve Schaffer – bass guitar
 Joe Osborn – bass guitar
 Larrie Londin – drums
 Kenny Malone – drums
 Lanny Avery – drums
 Jerry Carrigan – drums
 Denis Solee – clarinet, flute, saxophone
 Dennis Good – trombone, saxophone
 Roger Bissell – trombone
 George Cunningham – trumpet
 Don Sheffield – trumpet
 Bobby Taylor – oboe
 Bergen White – horn and string arrangements (1–6, 8–13)
 Mark Price – horn and string arrangements (7)
 Sheldon Kurland Strings – strings
 Chris Harris – backing vocals
 Cindy Lipford – backing vocals
 Marty McCall – backing vocals
 Gwen Moore – backing vocals
 Gary Pigg – backing vocals

Production

 Chris Christian – producer
 Brown Bannister – co-producer, liner notes, engineer, mixing
 Warren Peterson – overdub engineer
 Wade Jaynes – assistant engineer
 Lanny Avery – assistant engineer
 Glenn Meadows – mastering
 Masterfonics, Nashville, Tennessee – mastering location
 Charles Wallis, Inc. – original cover design 
 Patrick Pollei – original cover design 
 Michael Harris Design – design
 Michael Borum – photography

Charts

Weekly charts

End of year charts

References 

Amy Grant albums
1977 debut albums
Myrrh Records albums